Sir Bob Bofeng Dadae  (born 8 March 1961) is a Papua New Guinean politician who serves as the tenth and current Governor-General of Papua New Guinea. He assumed office as the tenth governor-general on 28 February 2017, succeeding Michael Ogio.

He was educated at the Ombo Lutheran Agency in Derim and the Bugandi High School, before completing a Bachelor of Commerce degree from the University of Papua New Guinea (1988) and Master of Business Administration degree from Griffith University (1995). Prior to his election to parliament, he was an accountant for the Evangelical Lutheran Church of Papua New Guinea and a board member of the Christian Press publishing house.

He was elected to the National Parliament of Papua New Guinea at the 2002 election as the United Party member for Kabwum Open, becoming the party's deputy leader after the election. He became Deputy Speaker in 2004. He was again re-elected at the 2007 election, and served as Minister for Defence under Michael Somare from 2007 to 2011. He crossed to the People's National Congress after Somare's 2011 ouster, and was re-elected under that banner at the 2012 election.

He was appointed to the Order of St Michael and St George on 5 May 2017. He was appointed to the Order of St John on 18 August 2017.

Dadae was nominated to run for a second term as Governor-General in December 2022 alongside Winnie Kiap and Stephen Pokawin.

References 

1961 births
Living people
Governors-General of Papua New Guinea
Grand Companions of the Order of Logohu
Knights Grand Cross of the Order of St Michael and St George
Knights of the Order of St John
Members of the National Parliament of Papua New Guinea
People's National Congress (Papua New Guinea) politicians
University of Papua New Guinea alumni
Griffith University alumni
People from Morobe Province